Volkmann is a German surname. Notable people with the surname include:

Alfred Wilhelm Volkmann (1801-1877), German physiologist
Elisabeth Volkmann (1936-2006), German actress
 John Volkmann (1905–1980), American scientist
Paul Oskar Eduard Volkmann (1856-1938), German physicist and philosopher 
Richard von Volkmann (1830-1889), German surgeon
Robert Volkmann (1815-1883), German composer

See also
Volkmann's contracture, a disease causing stiffness of the hand
Volkmann's fracture, a type of bone fracture of the fibula
Volkmann's canals, microscopic structures in animal bone
Volkman

German-language surnames